Khandagay is a rural locality (a settlement) in Khorinsky District, Republic of Buryatia, Russia. The population was 448 as of 2010. There are 9 streets.

Geography 
Khandagay is located 61 km southwest of Khorinsk (the district's administrative centre) by road. Tarbagatay is the nearest rural locality.

References 

Rural localities in Khorinsky District